Aleksey Negmatov  (born on 4 January 1986) is a Tajikistani footballer who plays as a defender for FC Vakhsh and the Tajikistan national football team.

Career statistics

International

Statistics accurate as of match played 11 October 2011

International goals

Honours
Vakhsh Qurghonteppa
Tajik League (1): 2009
Regar-TadAZ
Tajik Cup (1): 2012
Tajikistan
AFC Challenge Cup (1): 2006

References

External links
 

1986 births
Living people
Tajikistani footballers
Tajikistan international footballers
Association football fullbacks
Vakhsh Qurghonteppa players
Footballers at the 2006 Asian Games
Tajikistani people of Russian descent
Asian Games competitors for Tajikistan